The Sheep Thief (aka: Sheep's Feast) is a 1997 United Kingdom 16 mm short film by Asif Kapadia lasting 24 minutes, and is Kapadia's graduation film from the Royal College of Art.

Production
The story idea was itself based upon a bible story told by a teacher to Kapadia when he was seven years old about a thief who became a saint. Understanding his concept would not work as well if shot in the United Kingdom, he raised funds and traveled to Rajasthan, India where he worked with film students from the Indian Film School, in Pune and cast and shot with local talent.

Plot
Tashan (Abdul Rehman) is young street kid caught while stealing a sheep.  He is branded on his forehead for stealing and left for dead.  Waking, he covers the brand with a headband and embarks on a journey throughout rural India. On a backwoods dirt road he meets Safia (Kokila Mahendra), helps her, and eventually becomes an accepted member of her family.

Cast
 Abdul Rehman as Tashan
 Soaib Karimbhai as Ya Ya
 Jigar Bikhabhai as Zed
 Kokila Mahendra as Safia

Recognition

Awards and nominations
 1998, won the Cinefondation's Deuxième Prix at the Cannes Film Festival
 1997, won Grand Prix at Brest European Short Film Festival   
 1998, won 'Best Short Film Award' at St. Petersburg Film Festival  
 1999, won 'Best Short Film Award' at the International Children's Film Festival in Isfahan, Iran
 1998, won 'Best Short Film' at Melbourne Film Festival
 1998, won 'Best Director' award at Poitiers Film Festival
 1998, won 'Most Promising Director Award' at Tel Aviv Film Festival
 1998, won 'International Prix de Aaton' at Locarno Film Festival 
 1998, won 'Jury Prize' at New York Expo Short Film Festival
 1998, won 'Jury Prize' at FilmVideo Montecatini International Short Film Festival 
 1997, won 'Best Cinematography' at Cinematexas International Short Film Festival

Releases
The film is included on CINEMA 16, the DVD of British Short films.

It screened at Clermont Ferrand, Toronto and London Film Festivals, was televised in the United Kingdom by Channel 4, and across Europe by Canal +, ZDF and Arte.

References

External links
 The Sheep Thief at the Internet Movie Database
 The Sheep Thief at the British Film Institute

1997 films
1997 short films
1990s road movies
British short films
Student films
British road movies
Films about criminals
Films directed by Asif Kapadia
Films scored by Dario Marianelli
Films set in India
Films shot in Rajasthan
1990s British films